Rudolf Paabo (also Rudolf or Ruudolf Paap; 18 July 1889 Kavastu, Estonia (then part of Russian Empire) – 19 May 1942 Kirov Oblast, Russian SFSR, Soviet Union) was an Estonian politician. He was a member of the first legislature of the Estonian parliament (Riigikogu) which sat in 1920–1923. Paabo became a member of parliament on 24 November 1922, when he replaced Villem Aleksander Reinok. Just five days later, on 29 November 1922, Paabo resigned from his seat and was replaced by Paul Öpik.

References

1889 births
1942 deaths
Members of the Riigikogu, 1920–1923
Estonian people who died in Soviet detention